Mohammad Aizaz Sohail (Urdu: محمد اعزاز سہیل) is a Pakistani singer from Karachi. Born on May 22, 1987, Aizaz is a trained singer in eastern classical music.  He is well known for his appearances in Pakistan Superstar and Pakistan Television Corporation's program 'Firdous-e-Gosh'. Also a teacher to many renowned names of our music industry,

Early life

Mohammad Aizaz Sohail was born on May 22, 1987, in Karachi ,Pakistan. Mohammad Aizaz Sohail started singing at a very tender age of 6 years. He understood the intricacies of music at a small age under the guidance of his mother. At school level he used to lead the band choir and his college helped him unlock his full potential. When Tsunami struck Indonesia and almost every Pakistani was engrossed in collecting funds, Aizaz performed with the renowned Ghazal singer Tina Sani and received much praise and admiration. He won the ISEO (International Schools Education Olympiad) in the vocal category. Aizaz started taking formal Classical training from Master Abdul Rauf. Just after 6 months of training he was able to obtain a Gold medal in the All Pakistan Music Conference in the classical category. He also secured 2nd Position in the reality show Pakistan Superstar. Aizaz is the student of Ustad Faheem Mazhar. He is also taking help for vocal training from Anol Chatterjee who is the senior disciple of Pandit Ajoy Chakrabarty. He has worked in Pakistan Television Corporation and many other TV channels making successful appearances.

Career

Mohammad Aizaz Sohail is active in the field of music and has performed in the prestigious All Pakistan Music Conference, Pakistan Superstar, Superstars of Tomorrow by Radio1 FM91 and the Octave Project. Aizaz made his first TV appearance in PTV World's program Weekend World since 2014 and has appeared in the program numerous times. Aizaz and his group of musicians performed as guest band for Absolute Manto by Olomopolo Media. Aizaz became known for his regular appearances in PTV Home's program Firdous-e-Gosh based on eastern classical music.

All Pakistan Music Conference

Aizaz got the opportunity to perform thrice in the most prestigious event of Pakistani Eastern Classical music, All Pakistan Music Conference from the year 2013 and on wards. All Pakistan Music conference (APMC) was founded in 1959 for the promotion of classical music in Pakistan and is being held every year. Aizaz made his debut APMC in October 2013 in which he performed and won a gold medal in the amateur classical category. Aizaz was promoted to the professional Classical Category in 2014's edition of APMC and performed in the same category in the 2015's APMC edition as well. Aizaz returned at All Pakistan Music Conference in March 2019 and performed Raag Madhuvanti.

All Pakistan Music Conference Lahore

All Pakistan Music Conference Karachi

Pakistan Superstar

In the year 2014, Aizaz was selected to perform in the digital music reality show by the name of Pakistan Superstar and secured the 2nd position the show. The notable performance of Aizaz from this show are of Tu He Re and Kahay Cher Cher.

Octave Project

Aizaz performed in the Octave Project in 2014, a platform for performing arts for budding artists and musicians. He is well known for his cover of Breathless by Shankar Mahadevan and Zamanay Kay Andaaz by Junoon.

Firdous-e-Gosh

Aizaz joined the team of young singers in PTV Home's program Firdous-e-Gosh in 2014 where he performed the opening act the Lakshan Geet for the program along with a bunch of other classical singers as well. Firdous-e-Gosh is an eastern classical based show in which one Raag was thoroughly explained in an episode by theory and performances. Aizaz made his first appearance in the program in the Ahir Bhairav episode and continued till the last aired episode of the program. His notable performances in the program were Tan Mann Dhan Tope Varun from the episode of Raag Kalavati and Fusion from the Raag Charokeshi episode.

Khoye Hu'un Ki Justaju

Mohammad Aizaz Sohail recently joined and became a permanent part of Pakistan Television Corporation’s newly launched program Khoye Hu'un Ki Justaju as a singer. The concept of the program is based on remembering the bygone traditions, people and cultural values. Pakistan Television Corporation chairman Atta ul Haq Qasmi is himself a permanent part of the show. Aizaz has been assigned to remember and share the memories of Pakistan’s music of the golden era.

Lahore Music Meet

Lifetime Learning At LUMS

Mohammad Aizaz worked as an assistant professor at the Lifetime Learning At LUMS Programme along with the noted Kathak dancer Nighat Chaodhry and Imran Mushter Nafees. He taught Music in collaboration with Dance and Theater. A course which gives an exhaustive insight to performing arts along with the opportunity to perform on-stage. He is currently teaching his own course of vocal culturing

Bands

Mughal-E-Funk

Mohammad Aizaz has performed at a number of places with the South-Asian Funk Fusion Band called Mughal-E-Funk. Performing at True Brew Studios, Levi's Live  and the Governor House Sindh at British Council's 70th Birthday  to name a few.

Mekaal Hassan Band 
Mohammad Aizaz Sohail has also performed with the Lux Style Awards winning Mekaal Hassan Band as a featured vocalist in their recent tour and shows.

Amezish
Mohammad Aizaz recently formed a band by the name of Amezish  with Waleed Attique who is a bassist to many renowned names in our industry like the Mekaal Hassan Band, Shiraz Uppal  and Asrar to name a few. Also Lala Ahsan who is a drummer to Badnaam (band) who were the runners up in Pepsi Battle Of Bands. Their music is aimed at fusing Eastern and Western in a very different way as opposed to other fusion bands. Their debut track Lalit was well received by the masses and people from our industry.

Corporate Ventures

Coke Studio 2020 
Mohammad Aizaz appeared as a featured artist in Coke Studio 2020, also known as Coke Studio Season 13. He made his debut and performed Megh (raga) in the final episode of the season. While explaining the song, Aizaz told Coke Studio that, "This song is a five note (sur) raag; sa-re-ma-pa ni-sa and sa-ni-pa-ma-re-sa. It belongs to the kaafi thaat (family of raags) and the Megh raag is associated with rainfall. It is because of this raag that dark clouds form in the sky, making it rain. Those are the feels with which this raag has been made; the raag encapsulates you in the vision of serene rainfall atop a mountain”

Bisconni Music 

Mohammad Aizaz Sohail made an appearance in the first season of Bisconni Music and performed his composition of Meda Ishq with Mughal-e-Funk and Mahnoor Altaf. The lyrics of the song were taken from Bulleh Shah and Khwaja Ghulam Farid.

References

External links
Aizaz Sohail on Facebook
Aizaz Sohail on SoundCloud
Aizaz Sohail on Instagram

1987 births
Living people
Pakistani pop singers
Pakistani classical singers
Singers from Karachi
Muhajir people